Robinsonia longimacula is a moth in the family Erebidae. It was described by William Schaus in 1915. It is found in Brazil.

References

Moths described in 1915
Robinsonia (moth)